The Tennessee Women's Hall of Fame is a non-profit, volunteer organization that recognizes women who have contributed to history of the U.S. state of Tennessee.

History
The organization was founded and incorporated as a non-profit organization in 2010 to recognize accomplished women who have impacted the development of the state of Tennessee and improved the status of other women. It is the brainchild of the Women's Economic Council Foundation, Inc. and the Tennessee Economic Council on Women.

Criteria
The criteria for induction into the Tennessee Women's Hall of Fame is that women were born in and achieved recognition within the state; are or have a resident in Tennessee for an extended period of time or adopted Tennessee as their home state. Additional criteria includes women who,:
 Have made significant, unique and permanent contributions to the economic, political and cultural betterment of Tennessee;
 Have elevated the status of women;
 Have promoted other women and women’s issues;
 Have been advocates for those issues which are important to women and families

Inductees
The hall inducts new members annually or bi-annually and includes both contemporary and historical women or organizations which benefit women.

References

Further reading

External links

Tennessee-related lists
Lists of American women
Women's halls of fame
Organizations established in 2010
2010 establishments in Tennessee
Halls of fame in Tennessee
State halls of fame in the United States
History of women in Tennessee